Mýto pod Ďumbierom is a village and municipality in Brezno District, in the Banská Bystrica Region of central Slovakia.

Villages and municipalities in Brezno District